Candy Rain may refer to:

 Candy Rain (album), an album by Soul for Real
 "Candy Rain" (song), a song by Soul for Real
 Candy Rain (film), a 2008 Taiwanese film